Spudaea is a genus of moths of the family Noctuidae.

Species
 Spudaea eucrinita (Turati, 1933)
 Spudaea pontica Kljutschko, 1968
 Spudaea ruticilla (Esper, 1791)

References
Natural History Museum Lepidoptera genus database
Spudaea at funet

Cuculliinae